Scandalous: The All Star Compilation is a compilation album containing songs by Luther Campbell and a variety of other musicians including Big Punisher, Cam'ron and Trick Daddy.

Track listing
"Slippery When It's Wet"- 4:32 (Featuring Big Punisher, Terror Squad) 
"Suck This Dick"- 4:08 (Featuring Cam'ron)  
"Hoes"- 4:59 (Featuring Snoop Dogg, Daz Dillinger, Kurupt) 
"Could It Be"- 3:52 (Featuring HonoRebel, Shelly Diva) 
"Ain't Spending Nuthin'"- 3:12 (Featuring Krayzie Bone) 
"Hoe Stories"- 4:57 (Featuring Daz Dillinger, Sciryl) 
"Scarred"- 3:26 (Featuring Trick Daddy) 
"Bust a Nut"- 4:30 (Featuring The Notorious B.I.G.) 
"Strokin'"- 4:17 (Featuring 69 Boyz) 
"Freak Shawty"- 3:39 (Featuring Jayski) 
"Freak"- 5:28 (Featuring Aaron Hall) 
"Off da Hook"- 4:46 (Featuring Doug E. Fresh)

2002 compilation albums
Luther Campbell albums